The following is a list of notable online payment service providers and payment gateway providing companies, their platform base and the countries they offer services in:

(POS -- Point of Sale)

See also
 Payment gateway
 Payments as a service
 Ripple (payment protocol)

References

 

Online companies
Online payment service providers